Samuel Harvey Shapiro (born Israel Shapiro; April 25, 1907 – March 16, 1987) was the 34th governor of Illinois, serving from 1968 to 1969.  He was a member of the Democratic Party.

Life and career

Born in 1907 in the Governorate of Estonia of the Russian Empire, he emigrated to the United States at an early age.  He graduated from the University of Illinois College of Law.  As a lawyer, Shapiro practiced in Kankakee, Illinois.  Turning to public service, he was elected state's attorney (county prosecutor) of Kankakee County in 1936. From 1947–61 he served in the Illinois State House of Representatives, where he took a special interest in mental health issues.

Shapiro was elected the 38th Lieutenant Governor of Illinois in 1960 and again in 1964, and took office as governor when the previous governor Otto Kerner, Jr. resigned to accept appointment to the federal appellate court. Shapiro thus became the second Jewish governor of Illinois (Henry Horner being the first). Illinois thereby became the first state to have had two Jewish governors; New York, Oregon, Pennsylvania and Rhode Island have each since elected at least a second governor of the faith.

Upon becoming governor, Shapiro ran at once for a full term of his own but was narrowly defeated by Republican Richard B. Ogilvie in the 1968 election.  He then returned to private life, although he was called upon several times to serve on special commissions, the most significant of which was a commission to redraw state electoral boundaries in 1981.

Shapiro was an alumnus of the Alpha Epsilon Pi fraternity. From 1984 until his death, he led the effort to establish a permanent headquarters for the fraternity's national offices.  As a result, Alpha Epsilon Pi's International Headquarters is dedicated in his honor.

Shapiro continued to work as an attorney; his death was discovered when he failed to appear in court for a client and police were sent to his home in Kankakee to investigate. He is buried in Jewish Waldheim Cemetery in Forest Park, Illinois.  The state renamed the Kankakee Mental Health Center in his honor.

See also 

 List of U.S. state governors born outside the United States

References

External links 
 

1907 births
1987 deaths
American people of Estonian-Jewish descent
Democratic Party governors of Illinois
Estonian emigrants to the United States
Estonian Jews
Jewish American state governors of the United States
Lieutenant Governors of Illinois
District attorneys in Illinois
People from Kankakee, Illinois
Emigrants from the Russian Empire to the United States
20th-century American politicians
Burials in Forest Park, Illinois
University of Illinois College of Law alumni
20th-century American Jews